Kalsubai is a mountain in the Western Ghats, located in the Indian state of Maharashtra.

The mountain range lies within the Kalsubai-Harishchandragad Wildlife Sanctuary. It is visited throughout the year by avid trekkers, Kalsubai temple devotees and wildlife enthusiasts alike. It is named after one of the three sisters Kalsubai, Ratnabai and Katrabai. The other peak Ratangad is named after Ratnabai.

Geology 
The mountain range was formed by the same geological events that gave birth to the Western Ghats. Resting on the Deccan Plateau, a large igneous province, it consists of solidified flood basalt dating back to the Cenozoic era.

Geography and topography 

The peak along with the adjoining hills spans along a downward-slanting east to the west axis eventually merging with the formidable escarpment of the Western Ghats at almost right angles. Along its length, they form a natural boundary demarcating the Igatpuri Taluka, Nashik district at its north from the Akole Taluka, Ahmednagar district at its south.

The mountain along with adjoining hills forms an enormous catchment area for the Arthur Lake which it overlooks.

Reaching Kalsubai  

It can be reached by road, via Igatpuri on the Mumbai-Nasik route. Trains leaving from Mumbai provide an alternate mode of transport to Kasara railway station, with connecting State Transport buses, plying on the Akole-Kasara route, leading up to the base village. Private vehicles from Kasara provide yet another alternative to public transport.

Trekking  

This is a one-day trek having a moderately hard difficulty level, with lush green landscapes and multiple waterfalls. The peak attracts many trekkers and devotees determined to scale the mountain. To reach the summit there are well-designated trekking routes. The most popular route is through the eastern mountain face taking off from the base village Bari. The krushnavanti river, a tributary of Pravara, takes origin on its eastern slope and flows like a stream through the outer fringes of Bari. A short distance away from the stream a Hanuman temple has been built. This provides an important landmark to commence the trek as well as a resting post for those nearing the final lap of their trek. The route from behind this temple takes the hiker straight to the summit. The trek along this route is a mix of easy to ascend slopes as well as treacherous rocky outcrops overlooking the valley below. Considering the increasing footfall in recent years, the government has built iron ladders along the vertical hill slopes. These assist trekkers to allow for a convenient and safe ascent.

The route via Indore is relatively unexplored as not many people are aware of it. Unlike the regular route via Bari, which has fixed ladders, cemented steps and several people flocking during the monsoon, the route via Indore is raw with stone steps and a huge iron chain for support at the dangerous patches.

Kalsubai temple 

The truncated summit provides a modest area of flat land which holds a sacred temple of a local deity.

A traditional prayer service is held every Tuesday and Thursday by a priest. During the festival of Navratri a fair comes to be organized each year with many stalls being set up near the summit to provide pooja materials to the devotees. On these special occasions, local villagers participate in this fair which helps to supplement their livelihood and as well as provides them an opportunity to revere the mountain.

Ecology 

Kalsubai comes to be protected under the precincts of a sanctuary. It nurtures nature in the vast stretches of forests nestled along their slopes and valleys. Open high-altitude forests dominate the scene. In the post-monsoon period, the region witnesses a dramatic makeover with flowers of different colors and varieties blossoming along the landscape. This attracts a hoard of butterflies, bees, dragon-flies, and other insects to feed upon the precious nectar.

During winter mornings, reptiles like lizards and snakes could be spotted sun-bathing near the ladders.

Places of interest

Bhandardara Dam, located 6 km away, impounds the Pravara river to form the Arthur Lake.

Arthur Lake: The clear and placid lake is bounded by thick canopied forests of the Sahyadri hills. The Lake gets its water from the Pravara River. It also attracts one's attention from the summit.

Umbrella fall: it is  formed as water from the Arthur lake is released periodically to drain downstream during the rainy season.

Ratanwadi temple: There is a beautiful historic temple in the village Ratanwadi.

To the north of the mountain range forts such as Ramsej, Harihargad, Brahmagiri, Anjaneri, Ghargad, Bahula, Tringalwadi, Kavnai can be seen. To the east one can spot Aundha, Vishramgad, Bitangad, to the west Alang, Madangad, Kulang, Ratangad (southwest), and to the south Pabhargad, Ghanchakkar, Harishchandragad can be seen.

Culture and news 
Touted as an unusual wedding, on 28 December 2014, in the presence of close family members, a couple tied knot at the temple situated on the summit.

Celebrations for India's 69th Independence Day took place at the summit where the Navy unfurled the largest flag of India measuring 60 feet in length and 40 feet in breadth.

Photo gallery

See also
 List of mountain peaks of Maharashtra
 List of Indian states and union territories by highest point
 Salher
 Western Ghats (Sahyadris)

References

External links
  Travelogue of Kalsubai trek
 Kalasubai

Mountains of the Western Ghats
Ahmednagar district
Mountains of Maharashtra
Tourist attractions in Ahmednagar district
Highest points of Indian states and union territories

https://youtube.com/shorts/MNKQxdIjQQw?feature=share